Luca Gerbino Polo (born 6 July 1987) is an Italian professional footballer who last played as a forward for IK Frej in Sweden.

Career
Gerbino Polo started his senior career with U.S. Ponzano Calcio. In 2008, he signed for Ravenna in the Italian Serie C, where he made over 59 appearances and scored eight goals. After that, he played for Rimini 1912, Valsta Syrianska IK, AFC Eskilstuna, Akropolis IF, IF Brommapojkarna, and IK Frej.

References

External links 
 
 EXCLUSIVE - An Italian in Sweden: Interview with Luca Gerbino Polo
 Gerbino Polo's fable: "Now sign goal in Sweden"
 Gerbino Polo, the Italian who grew up in Sweden: I chose to take risks, it was worth it
 ICN EXCLUSIVE: Interview with Luca Gerbino Polo, the bomber from Treviso with more than 50 goals in Sweden

1987 births
Living people
Italian footballers
Association football forwards
Ravenna F.C. players
Rimini F.C. 1912 players
AFC Eskilstuna players
Akropolis IF players
IF Brommapojkarna players
IK Frej players
Serie C players
Superettan players
Ettan Fotboll players
Italian expatriate footballers
Italian expatriate sportspeople in Sweden
Expatriate footballers in Sweden